
Freund (German for friend) is a surname. Notable people with the surname include:

Family names 
 August Freund, an Austrian chemist
 Freund reaction, discovered in 1881 by August Freund
 Bernhard II. Erich Freund, Duke of Saxe-Meiningen (1800–1882)
 Carl (William Freund) Walther (1858–1915), a German gunsmith
 Caroline Freund, American economist
 Christine Freund, a shooting victim
 Deborah Anne Freund, president of Claremont Graduate University in Claremont, California
 Don Freund (born 1947, Pittsburgh), an American composer and Professor of Composition
 Ðuro Freund, a Yugoslav Olympic fencer
 Ernst Freund (1864–1932), American legal scholar
 Etelka Freund (1879–1977), a Hungarian pianist
 Lawrence Joseph "Frank" Freund (1875–1933), a Major League Baseball catcher
 Gisèle Freund (1912–2000), photographer
 Hildegard Freund (1883–1933), Austrian politician and social campaigner
 Hugo Freund Sonnenschein, a prominent American economist and educational administrator
 Jacob Lincoln Freund (1918–2010), an American stage-, television- and film actor
 Jim Freund, a radio personality
 John Christian Freund (1848–1924), co-founder of Music Trades magazine in New York City
 Jonas Charles Hermann Freund (1808–1879), Austrian-British physician
 Jules T. Freund (1890–1960), immunologist
 Karl Freund (1890–1969), cinematographer and film director
 Kurt Freund (1914–1996), physician and sexologist
 Leopold Freund (1868–1943), a Jewish Austrian radiologist
 Marya Freund (1876–1966), French soprano
 Michael Freund (disambiguation):
 Michael Freund (historian)
 Michael Freund (activist), founder and chairman of the Jewish organization Shavei Israel
 Moshe Aryeh Freund (1894–1996), the Chief Rabbi (av beis din) of the Edah HaChareidis in Jerusalem
 Otto Kahn-Freund (1900–1979),  professor of comparative law
 Oliver Freund (born 1970), German footballer
 Paul A. Freund (1908–1992), American jurist and law professor
 Petra Schürmann-Freund (1933–2010), a German model, TV announcer, and actress
 Renate Freund (born 1939), German author
 Severin Freund, German ski jumper
 Steffen Freund (born 1970), German footballer
 Steve Freund (born 1952, Brooklyn), a blues guitarist, vocalist, bandleader and record producer
 Tom Freund, American singer-songwriter
 Wilhelm Freund (1806–1894), German philologist and lexicographer
 Wilhelm Alexander Freund (1833–1917), a German gynecologist
 Wilhelm Salomon Freund (1831–1915), a Jewish German lawyer and politician
 Yoav Freund, a researcher and professor at the University of California

Freundt 

 Tracy Freundt, a Peruvian model

Other 
 Freund's adjuvant, an immune system booster used in some vaccines
 Der Amerikanische Freund, a 1977 film by Wim Wenders
 Der Freund ("The Friend"), a literary magazine published by Axel Springer AG
 Lied für einen Freund ("Song For A Friend"), the German entry in the Eurovision Song Contest 1988
 Andy mein Freund, the debut single by German singer Sandra (released in 1976)
 Freund-Heintz House, a registered historic building in Cincinnati, Ohio
 Freund Publishing House, a publishing company
 Freund–Rubin compactification
 Killinger and Freund Motorcycle, an attempt in 1935 by a group of 5 German engineers

See also 
 Freunde
 Freundlich
 Similar names: Freud, Freudiger, etc.

References 

German-language surnames
Jewish surnames
Yiddish-language surnames
Surnames from nicknames